Scots Uniting Church, originally known as the Scots Presbyterian Church, is a church in Albany in the Great Southern region of Western Australia. 

The church is located on York Street the main street through the centre of Albany. It is almost opposite St John's Anglican Church, giving a quiet atmosphere along the busy street.

Built to a Victorian Academic Gothic style, it is mostly constructed of finely crafted local granite and topped with a corrugated iron roof. The church has a strongly gabled form with rendered buttresses and heavily timbered doors.
Originally a Presbyterian church, it was the third Presbyterian congregation in Western Australia, commencing in January 1889. Services were originally held in the Albany Town Hall and the Penny Post buildings until the church was completed. The Melbourne architect Evander McIver was asked to draw up plans and W. Sangster was contracted to complete the construction. The foundation stone was laid in November 1891, with the building completed and opened in March 1892. The total cost of the building was £1416.

In 1969 a hall, kitchen, vestry and two rooms were added to the building and constructed from brick.

The name of the church was changed in 1977 when the Presbyterian church amalgamated with other churches to form the Uniting Church in Australia.

See also
 List of places on the State Register of Heritage Places in the City of Albany

References

1892 establishments in Australia
Uniting churches in Western Australia
Heritage places in Albany, Western Australia
Churches in Albany, Western Australia
York Street, Albany, Western Australia
State Register of Heritage Places in the City of Albany